The Hurley Pro at Trestles is a World Surf League Men's Championship Tour event held in Trestles, California. It debuted in the 2000 ASP World Tour, initially sponsored by Billabong, and has been held annually since 2002.

Naming
Since the birth of this competition it had different names.

Past finals

External links 
 WSF official website

References  

 
World Surf League
Surfing competitions in California
2000 establishments in California
Recurring sporting events established in 2000